Âu Hồng Nhung (born May 27, 1993) is a member of the Vietnam women's national volleyball team.

Clubs 
  Thông tin Liên Việt Post Bank

Awards

Individual 
2016 VTV Binh Dien International Cup - "Best Opposite"

Clubs
 2010 Vietnam League -  Champion, with Thông tin Liên Việt Post Bank
 2011 Vietnam League -  Runner-Up, with Thông tin Liên Việt Post Bank
 2012 Vietnam League -  Champion, with Thông tin Liên Việt Post Bank
 2013 Vietnam League -  Champion, with Thông tin Liên Việt Post Bank
 2014 Vietnam League -  Champion, with Thông tin Liên Việt Post Bank
 2015 Vietnam League -  Champion, with Thông tin Liên Việt Post Bank
 2016 Vietnam League -  Runner-Up, with Thông tin Liên Việt Post Bank
 2017 Vietnam League -  Runner-Up, with Thông tin Liên Việt Post Bank
 2018 Vietnam League -  Runner-Up, with Thông tin Liên Việt Post Bank
 2019 Vietnam League -  Champion, with Thông tin Liên Việt Post Bank
 2020 Vietnam League -  Champion, with Thông tin Liên Việt Post Bank
 2021 Vietnam League -  Champion, with Bộ Tư lệnh Thông tin - FLC

References

1993 births
Living people
People from Lạng Sơn Province
Vietnamese women's volleyball players
Vietnam women's international volleyball players
Outside hitters
Liberos
21st-century Vietnamese women